Michael James Powell (born 5 April 1975 in Bolton) is an English cricketer and coach who played for and captained Warwickshire County Cricket Club. He also played for Griqualand West in South Africa in the 2001–02 season, and three matches for Otago in New Zealand in the 2005–06 season.

He captained Warwickshire from 2001 to 2003. In the 2001 season, the team were promoted from Division Two to Division One of the County Championship, and in the 2002 season they finished as runners-up in Division One, as well as winning the Benson & Hedges Cup Final at Lord's.

Currently Powell coaches cricket at Rugby School.
Powell was awarded a Benefit Year in 2008 but did not have his contract renewed at the end of that season following an appraisal of the playing staff under new coach Ashley Giles

In February 2010 it was announced that Powell would be working with Cricket Scotland as their new High Performance batting coach with a specific remit of developing and improving young Scottish cricketers.

See also
 List of Otago representative cricketers

References

External links
 Player Profile: Mike Powell from Cricinfo
 Mike Powell at CricketArchive
 
 Powell joins Scotland as batting coach from Cricinfo

1975 births
Living people
English cricketers
Warwickshire cricketers
Warwickshire cricket captains
Griqualand West cricketers
Otago cricketers
People educated at Lawrence Sheriff School
Cricketers from Bolton
Marylebone Cricket Club cricketers